is a Japanese professional skateboarder. She won gold medals in the inaugural women's park events at the Asian Games, in 2018, and at the Olympic Games, in 2021.

Career
Yosozumi started skateboarding in 2013 and was influenced by her older brother to take up the sport. In September 2017, it was reported that on weekdays she trained for five hours after attending school.

World Cup
At the 2016 World Cup Skateboarding which was hosted in Tokyo, she competed in the women's park event where she finished 29th among competitors. She returned in the 2018 edition hosted in Orange, California and competed in the bowl event instead where she placed sixth.

Vans Park Series
Yosozumi skated at the 2017 Vans Park Series (VPS) Asian Championships in Singapore where she finished third. At the women's division of the VPS Pro Tour in Brazil in June 2018, Yosozumi claimed the top spot by outbesting Yndiara Asp of Brazil and Brighton Zeuner of the United States. At the Huntington Beach, California leg, she finished second in the qualifying round, though she failed to reach the podium in the final and finished fifth overall.

X Games
Yosuzumi competed at X Games Minneapolis 2018 in the women's park event. She finished second in the qualifying round while she obtain a bronze medal in the final behind gold medalist Brighton Zeuner and Sabre Norris of Australia.

Asian Games
She represented Japan at the 2018 Asian Games, hosted in Jakarta and Palembang, Indonesia. Yosozumi claimed one of Japan's three gold medals in the skateboard discipline after topping the rankings of the women's park event. She performed ahead of silver medalist and compatriot Kaya Isa and bronze medalist Zhang Xin of China.

Olympics 
At the 2020 Summer Olympics in Tokyo, Yosozumi competed in the first-ever Olympic women's park skateboarding event, in which she claimed the gold medal with a best score of 60.09. She narrowly bested compatriot Kokona Hiraki, who took silver with a 59.04 score, and Team GB competitor Sky Brown, who took bronze with a 56.47 score.

References

External links
 
 Sakura Yosozumi at The Boardr

Living people
2002 births
Japanese skateboarders
Female skateboarders
X Games athletes
Medalists at the 2018 Asian Games
Skateboarders at the 2018 Asian Games
Asian Games gold medalists for Japan
Asian Games medalists in skateboarding
Skateboarders at the 2020 Summer Olympics
Medalists at the 2020 Summer Olympics
Olympic medalists in skateboarding
Olympic gold medalists for Japan
Olympic skateboarders of Japan
Japanese sportswomen
Sportspeople from Wakayama Prefecture
People from Iwade, Wakayama
World Skateboarding Championship medalists
21st-century Japanese women